Araneus saevus is a species of orb weaver in the spider family Araneidae. It is found in North America, Europe, and Russia (Far East).

References

External links

 

Araneus
Articles created by Qbugbot
Spiders described in 1872